David District is a district (distrito) of Chiriquí Province in Panama. The population according to the 2000 census was 124,280. The district covers a total area of 870 km². The capital lies at the city of David.

Administrative divisions
The district is divided administratively into the following corregimientos:

David (capital)
Bijagual
Cochea
Chiriquí
Guacá
Las Lomas
Pedregal
San Carlos
San Pablo Nuevo
San Pablo Viejo
David Sur
David Este

References

Districts of Panama
Chiriquí Province